Antithesis (Greek for "setting opposite", from  "against" and  "placing") is used in writing or speech either as a proposition that contrasts with or reverses some previously mentioned proposition, or when two opposites are introduced together for contrasting effect. This is based on the logical phrase or term.

Antithesis can be defined as "a figure of speech involving a seeming contradiction of ideas, words, clauses, or sentences within a balanced grammatical structure. Parallelism of expression serves to emphasize opposition of ideas".

An antithesis must always contain two ideas within one statement. The ideas may not be structurally opposite, but they serve to be functionally opposite when comparing two ideas for emphasis.

According to Aristotle, the use of an antithesis makes the audience better understand the point the speaker is trying to make. Further explained, the comparison of two situations or ideas makes choosing the correct one simpler. Aristotle states that antithesis in rhetoric is similar to syllogism due to the presentation of two conclusions within a statement.

Antitheses are used to strengthen an argument by using either exact opposites or simply contrasting ideas, but can also include both. They typically make a sentence more memorable for the reader or listener through balance and emphasis of the words.

Rhetorical antithesis 
In rhetoric, antithesis is a figure of speech involving the bringing out of a contrast in the ideas by an obvious contrast in the words, clauses, or sentences, within a parallel grammatical structure.

The term "antithesis" in rhetoric goes back to the 4th century BC, for example Aristotle, Rhetoric, 1410a, in which he gives a series of examples.

An antithesis can be a simple statement contrasting two things, using a parallel structure:

I defended the Republic as a young man; I shall not desert her now that I am old. (Cicero, 2nd Philippic, 2.118)

Often there is a double antithesis, as in the following proverb, where "man" is opposed to "God", and "proposes" is contrasted with "disposes":

Man proposes, God disposes. (anonymous)

Another type is of the form "not A, but B" (negative-positive), in which the point made is emphasised by first being contrasted with its negative:

I came not to bring peace but a sword. (St Matthew's Gospel, 10:34).

Another type involves an antimetabole (AB, BA word order), in which the contrasted words switch places:

In peace you long for war, and in war you long for peace.
Two things show feebleness of mind: holding your breath at the time for speaking, and speaking when you should be silent. (Saadi)

The negative-positive antithesis and the antimetabole-antithesis can be combined, as in the following sentence:
Ask not what your country can do for you – ask what you can do for your country. – Inauguration of John F. Kennedy, 1961.

An antithesis can also be combined with synonymous parallelism. In the following example, the first (A, A') and second couplet (B, B') are parallel synonymously with the same adverb and verb combination distinguishing the couplets: “still do”/”still be”//”still do”/”still be.” An antithesis is formed with line A contrasting “evil” with “right” in line B.  Line A' contrasts the “filthy” with the “holy” in line B'.
•	A Let the evildoer still do evil, 
•	A' and the filthy still be filthy,
•	B and the righteous still do right. 
•	B' and the holy still be holy (Revelation 22:11).

Some literary examples 
Some other examples of antithesis are:

 Give every man thy ear, but few thy voice. (William Shakespeare, Hamlet)
 For many are called, but few are chosen. (Matthew 22:14)
 Never give in — never, never, never, never, in nothing great or small, large or petty, never give in except to convictions of honour and good sense. (by Winston Churchill)
 It was the best of times, it was the worst of times, it was the age of wisdom, it was the age of foolishness, it was the epoch of belief, it was the epoch of incredulity, it was the season of Light, it was the season of Darkness, it was the spring of hope, it was the winter of despair, we had everything before us, we had nothing before us, we were all going direct to Heaven, we were all going direct the other way... (Charles Dickens, A Tale of Two Cities)
 We must learn to live together as brothers or perish together as fools. (Martin Luther King Jr., speech at St. Louis, 1964.)
 The world will little note, nor long remember what we say here, but it can never forget what they did here. (Abraham Lincoln, The Gettysburg Address, 1863.)
 He who desires peace, should prepare for war. (Vegetius, Epitoma Rei Militaris, book 3, introduction.)
 For now we see in a mirror dimly, but then face to face. Now I know in part; then I shall understand fully, even as I have been fully understood. (St Paul, 1st Epistle to the Corinthians 13:12, Revised Standard Version-Catholic Edition)
 My men have become women, and my women, men. (King Xerxes at the Battle of Salamis (480 BC), according to Herodotus 8.88.3)
 Senator, in everything I said about Iraq I turned out to be right and you turned out to be wrong. (George Galloway at a US Senate hearing, May 2005.)
 I'm not saying that this or that statue was stolen from there; I'm saying this, that you, Verres, left not one single statue in Aspendus. (Cicero, In Verrem, 2.1.53.)
 I have a dream that my four little children will one day live in a nation where they will not be judged by the color of their skin but by the content of their character. (Martin Luther King Jr., 1963.)
 For contemplation he and valour formed, For softness she and sweet attractive grace; He for God only, she for God in him. (John Milton, Paradise Lost)

The "Antitheses" in St Matthew's Gospel 

Matthew's Antitheses is the traditional name given to a section of the Sermon on the Mount where Jesus takes six well known prescriptions of the Mosaic Law and calls his followers to do more than the Law requires. Protestant scholars since the Reformation have generally believed that Jesus was setting his teaching over against false interpretations of the Law current at the time. "Antithesis" was the name given by Marcion of Sinope to a manifesto in which he contrasted the Old Testament with the New Testament and defined what came to be known as Marcionism.

In philosophical discussion 

In dialectics (any formal system of reasoning that arrives at the truth by the exchange of logical arguments) antithesis is the juxtaposition of contrasting ideas, usually in a balanced way. The logical arguments are said to be stated in the order thesis, antithesis, synthesis.

Although this style of philosophical discussion (stating a point of view, then its opposite, and finally drawing a conclusion) was commonly used by ancient philosophers, the use of the trio "thesis, antithesis, synthesis" itself to describe it goes back only to the 18th century, to a work published in 1794 by the German philosopher Johann Gottlieb Fichte.

The phrase is sometimes incorrectly stated to originate from the German philosopher Hegel. However, Hegel never actually used the trio of terms except once in a lecture, in which he reproached Immanuel Kant for having "everywhere posited thesis, antithesis, synthesis".

See also 

 Alternative hypothesis
 Dialectical materialism
 Dialectic
 Opposite
 Antimetabole
 Figure of speech

References

 - Antithesis in Plato's Euthydemus and Lysis

Figures of speech
Rhetoric